Vladimir Jelčić (born 10 October 1968) is a retired Croatian handball player. He is ex-assistant coach of RK Zagreb.

He played for the Croatia national handball team at the 1996 Summer Olympics in Atlanta, where Croatia won the gold medal.

He was part of the RK Zagreb team that won the 1992 and 1993 European Champions Cup.
He also helped RK Zadar reach the semi-final of the EHF Cup in 1996 which is to date the club biggest achievement.

He is currently the assistant coach in RK Zagreb.

Honours
Metković
Croatian Cup
Winner (1): 2002
Yugoslav Third League
Winner (1): 1985-86

Zagreb
Croatian First A League
Winner (6): 1991-92, 1992-93, 1993-94, 1994-95, 1999-00, 2000-01
Croatian Cup
Winner (5): 1992, 1993, 1994, 1995, 2000
Yugoslav First League
Winner (2): 1988-89, 1990-91
Yugoslav Cup
Winner (1): 1991
European Champions Cup
Winner (2): 1991-92, 1992-93
EHF Champions League
Finalist (1): 1994-95
EHF Super Cup
Winner (1): 1993
Finalist (1): 1998

Celje
1. SRL
Winner (3): 1996-97, 1997-98, 1998-99
Slovenian Cup
Winner (3): 1997, 1998, 1999

Trieste 
Serie A
Winner (1): 2001-02
Coppa Italia
Winner (1): 2002

Individual
Franjo Bučar State Award for Sport - 1996
Best Croatian sports team by: COC: 1996

Orders
Order of Danica Hrvatska with face of Franjo Bučar - 1995

External links
 Vladimir Jelčić on European Handball Federation pages

References

1968 births
Living people
People from Čapljina
Croats of Bosnia and Herzegovina
Croatian male handball players
Olympic handball players of Croatia
Handball players at the 1996 Summer Olympics
Olympic gold medalists for Croatia
Olympic medalists in handball
RK Zagreb players
RK Zagreb coaches
Medalists at the 1996 Summer Olympics
Mediterranean Games gold medalists for Croatia
Competitors at the 1993 Mediterranean Games
Croatian handball coaches
Croatian expatriate sportspeople in Slovenia
Croatian expatriate sportspeople in Italy
Mediterranean Games medalists in handball